Max Tetzner (25 September 1896 – 7 November 1932) was a Dutch footballer. He played in three matches for the Netherlands national football team from 1921 to 1922.

References

External links
 

1896 births
1932 deaths
Dutch footballers
Netherlands international footballers
Place of birth missing
Association footballers not categorized by position